Geoffrey Francis Allen (25 August 19028 November 1982) was the third Bishop of Derby.

Allen was educated at Dulwich College  and University College, Oxford, and after training at Ripon Hall was ordained in 1927. Following a brief curacy at St Saviour's, Liverpool, he was Chaplain of his old theological college, a Fellow of Lincoln College, Oxford, Lecturer at Union Theological College, Canton, the Deputy Provost of St Philip's Cathedral, Birmingham and then Archdeacon of Birmingham, 1944–47.

He was elevated to the episcopate as Bishop in Egypt in 1947. Returning to England following his resignation in late July 1952, he became Principal of Ripon Hall that December. During his time at Ripon, he was appointed an Assistant Bishop of Oxford. He was appointed to the See of Derby, where he served until 1969; he was elected and confirmed some time prior to his installation at Derby Cathedral on 4 July 1959.

References

1902 births
People educated at Dulwich College
Alumni of University College, Oxford
Fellows of Lincoln College, Oxford
Alumni of Ripon College Cuddesdon
Archdeacons of Birmingham
Anglican bishops of Egypt
Bishops of Derby
20th-century Anglican bishops in Africa
1982 deaths
Staff of Ripon College Cuddesdon
20th-century Church of England bishops